The term Comboni Missionaries can refer to either of two religious orders founded by Saint Daniele Comboni:
 Comboni Missionaries of the Heart of Jesus
 Comboni Missionary Sisters